Gyeongwon, Kyongwon, or Kyungwon (also written with hyphens) may refer to:
Kyung-won (name), Korean given name
Kyongwon County, North Hamgyong Province, North Korea
Gyeongwon Line, railway line between Seoul, South Korea and Wonsan, North Korea
Gyeongwon, a former name of Incheon, South Korea